Beryl Agatha Gilroy (née Answick; 30 August 1924 – 4 April 2001) was a Guyanese educator, novelist, ethno-psychotherapist, and poet. The Guardian described her as "one of Britain's most significant post-war Caribbean migrants." She emigrated to London in 1951 as part of the Windrush generation to attend the University of London, then spend decades teaching, writing, and improving education. She worked primarily with Black women and children as a psychotherapist and her children's books are lauded as some of the first representations of Black London. She is perhaps best known as the first Black head teacher in London.

Early years
Beryl Gilroy was born in Springlands, British Guiana on 30 August 1924 into a very large family. Her father died when she was young and she grew up in the care of her maternal grandparents as a sickly child. Both were influential: her grandfather taught her how to read and her grandmother, Sally Louisa James, was affected her deeply. She was an herbalist who managed the family smallholding. Gilroy spent a lot of time listening to woman chatting as they worked; her grandmother in particular told her folkloric tales and Guyanese proverbs. Gilroy began creative writing during her childhood and was homeschooled, as her grandparents did not think a formal education was good enough for her. At the age of 12, she was sent to Georgetown for schooling, in part to allow her to discover her independence.

Gilroy earned a first-class diploma from a teacher training college in Georgetown in 1945, then taught and lectured for a UNICEF nutrition program. She was also the school head of the infant section of the local governmental school. In 1951, she moved to the United Kingdom and earned a diploma in Child Development from the University of London. In a 1986 interview, she shared that she had to "relearn English because [she] spoke with Guyana idioms and Guyana expressions."

Education career
Being both Black and Caribbean made finding a teaching job difficult for Gilroy. She and E. R. Braithwaite were two of a handful of Caribbean teachers looking for jobs in London and were met with terrible stereotyping from British employers, namely their beliefs that Caribbeans were cannibals and lacked good hygiene. In the meantime, she worked in a mail order factory, as a maid, and as a dishwasher in a café to support herself. She was eventually employed by the Inner London Education Authority in 1953, making her the first Black female teacher in London. Her first teaching job was at a poor Catholic school in Bethnal Green where her third year pupils had already been taught racist stereotypes by their parents. In her 1976 memoir Black Teacher, she recalls the children whimpering and hiding under the table when she first arrived. During this time, she met and married Patrick Gilroy, a British scientist of German heritage who was an active anti-colonialist. She stepped away from teaching between 1956 and 1968 to raise their children, Darla-Jane and Paul, and to earn her Master's degree in psychology. 

She returned to teaching in 1968, this time as the deputy head at Beckford Primary School (renamed West Hampstead Primary School in 2021). Schools had become more racially diverse during her time away; she variably estimated that between 33 to 55 different nationalities now filled the classrooms. The British Parliament passed the Race Relations Act in 1965, making it possible for her to serve on the Race Relations Board. In 1969, she became the first-ever Black head teacher in London. Despite her rank, she received a lower wage than her oftentimes prejudiced colleagues. In 1980, she took an MA in education at the University of Sussex. She left Beckford in 1982 and moved to the Centre for Multi-Cultural Education, which was run by University of London's Institute of Education and the Inner London Education Authority. In the early 1980s, she co-founded Camden Black Sisters, an information and support group for local Black women. She started her PhD in 1984 at Century University in the United States and completed her doctorate in counselling psychology in 1987. She left the Centre in 1990.

Writing
Gilroy's early work examines the impact of life in Britain on West Indian families and her later work explores issues of African and Caribbean diaspora and slavery. Many of her stories, both fiction and non-fiction, came from her time as a teacher or the stories her grandmother told when she was a child. While she was home with her children from 1956 to 1968, she began writing what would become the Nippers series. These are considered the first children's stories about the Black British presence in London and were meant to replace the outdated Janet and John books. She felt that the series was relatable to children of all races because "they have the same problems, only they don't know it or won't accept it." New People at Twenty-Four, one of the books in the Nippers series, discussed interracial marriage. This was a first for a children's book by an author of any race. 

She finished her first novel, In Praise of Love and Children, in 1959, but had difficulty getting it published. It centred on the experiences of a young female Guyanese immigrant in London. Some publishers called it "psychological, strange, way-out, [and] difficult-to-categorise" while others regarded it as too colonial. The book was not published until 1994, more than 30 years later. Meanwhile, male Guyanese writers, such as Sam Selvon, George Lamming, E. R. Braithwaite, and V. S. Naipaul flourished. The one male writer she felt supported by was Andrew Salkey, who had a history of offering encouragement and assistance to women writers. Courtman suggests that Gilroy tried hard not to be "marginalised by any literary for black-feminist political label. In her life, she often had to carry the burden of representation in a way that white British-born writers have not." She has been considered by 21st-century scholars as the victim of "writing at the 'wrong' time and in the 'wrong' gender." It wasn't until the 1980s, when women were able to pursue publishing opportunities more readily, that any of her writing was legitimately read.

Black Teacher, Gilroy's 1976 memoir about her experiences as a Black teacher in London, was described by Sandra Courtman as an "experiment with an intermediary form – somewhere between fiction and autobiography, with a distinct non-linear structure. She felt compelled to write about her experiences as a teacher so a woman's story could be heard alongside books like Braithwaite's To Sir, With Love; she also wanted "to set the record straight." Marina Warner notes in the London Review of Books that, even though the books were both about being a Black Guyanese teacher in a poor, white London classroom: "Gilroy was accused of boasting and of exaggerating the prejudice she had faced; for her part, she complained her account had been softened in the editing. In To Sir, with Love Braithwaite had glowingly described his eventual success in an East End classroom, but he wasn't censured. A black woman's claims, however, were seen as vanity." Reviewing the book for Times Educational Supplement, a teacher from Stockwell Manor Comprehensive School argued that her rise to head teacher was easier than portrayed in the book. Edward Blishen's 1976 review for The Guardian concluded: "If in writing about her work in this multiracial school she doesn't always avoid mere splendid assertion, she makes up for it, again, with anecdotal details more splendid than any assertion." Since first publication, Black Teacher has been republished twice: by Bogle-L'Ouverture Publications in 1994 and in 2021 by Faber and Faber, the latter edition featuring an introduction by Bernardine Evaristo.

Personal life and death
Gilroy met her husband Patrick at the library at University College London. They married in 1954 and had two children: Darla-Jane and Paul. Inspired by the way her grandparents had raised her, she homeschooled both kids. Patrick died suddenly on 5 October 1975. She attended therapy to cope with her grief and came away even more interested in psychology and counselling than she already had been. She earned her doctorate in psychology and counselling 12 years later. Gilroy died on 4 April 2001 at the Royal Free Hospital in Camden, London, from an aortic aneurysm. She is buried at Highgate Cemetery. She had been scheduled to deliver a keynote speech at the 4th annual Caribbean Women Writers Association Conference two days after her death.

Gilroy liked fashion and enjoyed dressing up, even for teaching. The orange skirt suit she was wearing when she arrived in the UK was on display at the Victoria and Albert Museum as part of the Black British Style exhibition in 2004. She identified as a feminist throughout her life, something she felt was particularly important for Black women.

Honours and awards
 1982: Greater London Council's Creative Writing Prize
 1986: Greater London Council's Creative Writing Prize for Frangipani House 
 1987: Guyana Literary Prize for Frangipani House
 1989: Guyana Literary Prize for Boy Sandwich
 1990: Greater London Council award for services in education
 1992: Guyana Literary Prize for Stedman and Joanna
 1995: Honorary doctorate in psychology from the University of North London
 1996: Honoured by the Association of Caribbean Women Writers and Scholars
 1996: Guyana Literary Prize for Inkle and Yarico
 2000: Honorary fellowship from the University of London's Institute of Education for major contributions to educational psychology in London
 2004: Gilroy's orange skirt suit was included in an exhibition entitled Black British Style at the Victoria and Albert Museum
 2022: A mural of Gilroy by Fipsi Seilern outside West Hampstead Primary School, formerly Beckford Primary School

Bibliography
 1967–1971: Green and Gold Readers for Guyana - Longman, Green & Co.
 1973–1976: Nippers series - Macmillan Publishers
 1973: A Visitor from Home
 1973: Knock at Mrs. Herbs''' 
 1973: New People at Number 24 
 1973: The Paper Bag 
 1975: No More Pets 
 1975: Outings for Everyone 
 1975: The Present 
 1975: Rice and Peas 
 1976: Arthur Small 
 1976: New Shoes 
 1975: Little Nippers series - Macmillan Publishers
 1975: In Bed 1975: Bubu's Street 
 1975: Once Upon a Time 1976: Black Teacher - Cassell (reprinted Bogle-L'Ouverture, 1994; Faber and Faber, 2021)
 1978: In for a Penny 1980: Carnival of Dreams 1986: Frangipani House - Heinemann
 1989: Boy Sandwich - Heinemann
 1991: Steadman and Joanna: A Love in Bondage - Vantage Press
 1991: Echoes and Voices - Vantage Press
 1994: In Praise of Love and Children - Peepal Tree Press
 1994: Sunlight and Sweet Water - Peepal Tree
 1994: Gather the Faces - Peepal Tree
 1994: Inkie and Yarico - Peepal Tree
 1998: Leaves in the Wind - Mango Publishing
 2001: The Green Grass Tango (published posthumously)

 See also 
 Caribbean literature
 Betty Campbell, the first Black headteacher in Wales

External links
 Courtman, Sandra. Women Writers and the Windrush Generation: A Contextual Reading of Beryl Gilroy's In Praise of Love and Children in Andrea Levy's Small Island''.

References

1924 births
2001 deaths
20th-century British novelists
20th-century poets
20th-century women writers
Academics of the UCL Institute of Education
Afro-Guyanese people
Alumni of the University of London
Black British schoolteachers
Black British women writers
Caribbean women writers
Guyanese emigrants to the United Kingdom
Guyanese novelists
Guyanese women novelists
Guyanese women poets
Heads of schools in England